Harding University is a private university with its main campus in Searcy, Arkansas. It is the largest private university in Arkansas. Established in 1924, the institution offers undergraduate, graduate, and pre-professional programs. The university also comprises Harding School of Theology, located in Memphis, Tennessee, which was formerly known as Harding Graduate School of Religion. Harding is one of several institutions of higher learning associated with the Churches of Christ.

History

Foundation 
Harding College was founded in Morrilton, Arkansas, in April 1924 after the merging of two separate colleges: Arkansas Christian College of Morrilton, Arkansas, and Harper College of Harper, Kansas. It was named after James A. Harding, a minister and educator associated with Churches of Christ.

After Galloway Female College merged with Hendrix College in 1933, Harding College purchased Galloway's Searcy, Arkansas campus for a fraction of its estimated value and moved there in 1934.

Cold War 

Harding University first advocated pacifism and political disengagement, in line with its own founding influences like James A. Harding and David Lipscomb as well as with wider trends in many other evangelical Christian movements during late 19th- and early 20th-century America. This trajectory shifted during the Cold War, however. Harding became involved in the production of a series of animated cartoons extolling the virtues of free-market capitalism. This series, including "Make Mine Freedom" (1948) as well as "Meet King Joe" (1949), were all produced by John Southerland Productions as part of a concerted campaign to fight against the threats of communism at the beginning of the Cold War using popular media. Funding came from Alfred P. Sloan, the major figure at General Motors Corporation. The animations contrast mainstream American values with the values of Soviet communism. The initiative represented a central concern of Harding president George S. Benson, who believed that fighting socialism was a moral imperative.

National Education Program 
Early in his career, President Benson established the National Education Program to advocate the principles of belief in God, the constitution, and free enterprise, within an "Americanism" program. The NEP coordinated speaking engagements and produced and distributed reprints of Benson's speeches and newspaper columns, short films by a former Walt Disney employee, and other media. This program attracted many donations to Harding, including from Boeing and Gulf Oil. The NEP was initially part of the school's education department, and later the history department, where it was intertwined with the American Studies Program. Clifton Ganus Jr. and James D. Bales were also heavily involved.

NEP materials were used nationwide by groups such as the U.S. armed forces, public schools, colleges and universities, chapters of the American Legion, and local chambers of commerce. Some uses became controversial: Some companies required their employees to attend NEP-sponsored seminars and enclosed copies of Benson's lectures with their paychecks in hopes of addressing perceived restlessness. The Fulbright Memorandum of June 1961 raised concerns about use of NEP materials in the military. The NEP was charged with being a "Radical Right" organization in the 1964 book Danger on the Right, which Bales responded to in his 1965 book Americanism under Fire. The close relationship between Harding and the NEP delayed the college's accreditation until 1954 when the school incorporated it as a separate entity, although Benson, Ganus, and Bales continued their involvement and the NEP board was nearly identical to the college's. In the 1970s, the program dwindled in notoriety and moved to Oklahoma Christian College. The American Studies Institute continues as a legacy of this program.

Race relations

Segregation 
During segregation in the United States, the school remained racially segregated for most of the tenure of president George S. Benson, who defended Harding's delay in integrating. Benson believed Black people were inferior because they fell under the Curse of Ham. In 1957, student body president Bill Floyd circulated a "statement of attitude" that Harding was ready to integrate, and it was signed by over 75% of the students, faculty, and staff of the college. In response Benson made an address entitled titled “Harding College and the Colored Problem”, in which he put down the idea of integration as youthful idealism, and insisted that students should defer to the judgment of older people with more experience, such as the Harding board of trustees. He went further, stating that Black people were far better off in the US than in other countries, and that integration would result in destruction of property, the spread of venereal diseases, and increased pregnancies. He also stated that mixed marriages would lead to broken homes and a rise in crime. Benson maintained that mixing of the races was against the divine order. In 1953, Norman Adamson became the first black person accepted to Harding. However, when administrators learned he was black he was denied admission. 
  In 1963, three black students were admitted to the Searcy campus, making Harding the second private institution in Arkansas to admit black people. In a 2012 article, it was suggested that this decision was motivated by expectation that the coming Civil Rights Act would require "Harding to desegregate to continue receiving federal funds", but contemporary sources make no mention of this as a consideration: The Gazette applauded Harding's "voluntary action" as an "example" for other Arkansas church-related colleges and deserving an "ovation...for the grace with which they have undertaken this social change". The Bison proclaimed "Benson's leadership in the movement for equal opportunity makes us proud, even boastful; it makes us happy, even ecstatic", though at least one scholar viewed that statement "dubiously".

By 1969 Harding had only 20 black students out of a student body of over 2,000. While President Clifton L. Ganus, Jr, stated that he did not "see any Biblical injunction against it", he discouraged interracial relationships. Under his leadership, the Harding administration allowed students to enter into interracial relationships, but made it policy to caution them against it and informed their parents in writing. The policy of allowing such relationships was the focus of much anger from the families of some white students. In 1969, three black students who protested racism at the university were expelled. In 1969, Ganus attempted to placate students by promising to hire 'Negro' teachers, but this never transpired.

Since the Civil Rights Era 
In 1980, Richard King became the first African-American faculty member. In the fall of 2019, white students constituted 81 percent of the student body, 4.7% were black students, and 3.8% were Hispanic/Latino.

Botham Jean and the Benson Auditorium 
In 2020, a former graduate organized a petition drive to rename the Benson auditorium because of Benson's racist views. The petition also asked that the auditorium carry the name of Botham Jean instead, a recent Black alumnus who had been murdered in his own apartment by a white Dallas police officer who alleged she had confused their apartments and mistaken the 26-year-old for a burglar.

Upon review, and against the wishes of the Black Student Association, the university, under the leadership of Bruce McLarty, defended Benson and chose to retain the name. However, President McLarty recognized the university had no buildings or landmarks on campus that recognized Black Alumni and promised some sort of memorial to Botham Jean within a year.

Facing this controversy and a 23% decline in enrollment over 5 years, the board dismissed McLarty, with former president David Burks resuming control. Dr. Michael D. Williams became president June 2022.

Campus

Searcy 
The Searcy campus comprises 48 buildings located on  near the center of Searcy. The campus lies roughly between Race Avenue and Beebe-Capps Expressway and includes several other minor thoroughfares, the campus of Harding Academy, Harding Place (a retirement community), and portions of surrounding neighborhoods.

The campus includes the George S. Benson Auditorium, which sits facing the McInteer Bible and World Missions Center. Brackett Library, the American Studies Building (Education and English departments), the David B. Burks American Heritage Building (hotel and offices), Pattie Cobb Hall, and the Administration Building frame a grassy central commons area upon which can be found several paths, a fountain, and a bell tower made out of bricks from the institution that once stood there: Galloway Female College.

Recent additions have included several dormitories; expansions of the cafeteria, student center, art department, and the David B. Burks American Heritage Building. The McInteer Bible and World Missions Center, was built in a project that included closing a road and creating a pedestrian mall.

After competing in the Ganus Athletic Center from 1976 until 2006, Harding's volleyball and basketball teams moved back to the Rhodes-Reaves Field House. The field house is a round-topped airplane hangar built for France in WWII, and purchased as war surplus by George S. Benson. It was reconstructed on campus in 1947. In 2007 it was retrofitted to accentuate the already deafening acoustics of the facility, working to the advantage of the home teams and earning Harding the title of "Best Road Trip Destination in College Basketball." The campus also has intramural sports facilities, including an indoor facility built for the Harding Bison football team in 2019.

Noteworthy buildings 

The Dean L.C. Sears House, named for the first dean of Harding University, was a historic house registered in the National Register of Historic Places. Also on the registry is Pattie Cobb Hall.

The Reynolds Center was created through and named for philanthropist Donald W. Reynolds.

Satellite campuses and campuses abroad 
The university maintains satellite campuses in Arkansas, one in North Little Rock and a second in Rogers.

Harding maintains permanent campuses in Florence and Athens. Study abroad semester programs are also provided in Brisbane, London, Paris, Arequipe (Chile), and Kalomo (Zambia).

Academics

Organization 
Structurally, the university comprises nine separate colleges: the College of Allied Health, the College of Arts & Humanities, the College of Bible & Ministry, the Paul R. Carter College of Business Administration, the Cannon-Clary College of Education, the Carr College of Nursing, the College of Pharmacy, the College of Sciences, and the Honors College. Each college then has its own subdivisions of departments or other sections. The university also has a School of Theology in Memphis. Between these nine colleges, the university provides ninety-seven majors, ten undergraduate degrees, fourteen pre-professional programs, and twenty-one graduate and professional degrees.

American Studies Institute
In 1953, Harding established the School of American Studies as an extension of President Benson's National Education Program in order to teach and train students in the founding principles of the United States Constitution. Rebranded the American Studies Institute (ASI), the center supplements students' academic training and promotes "a complete understanding of the institutions, values, and ideas of liberty and democracy." In doing so, the ASI exhibits a generally conservative political stance, focused on going "back to the fundamental values that made this country great."

Distinctions and rankings 
Harding supports a chapter of Kappa Omicron Nu, a national honor society for colleges and universities with a strong humanities program. The university was distinguished through the National Historic Chemical Landmarks program of the American Chemical Society for its contribution to the history of chemistry, which came for its William-Miles History of Chemistry Collection, established in 1992.

Harding University was listed among the Top Ten Schools nationwide by the Wall Street Journal and Times Higher Education under two different categories in 2017: student engagement and student inspiration. Harding consistently ranks in the Top 25 for Best Regional Universities in the South according to the U.S. News & World Report. In 2020, it ranked #249 among national universities overall. It was also rated at B+ by the American rankings and review company Niche.

Harding is accredited by the Higher Learning Commission. Specific colleges and programs have received further accreditation by specialized agencies as well.

Student life

Athletics

Harding has competed in the NCAA at the Division II level since 1997, beginning in the Lone Star Conference moving in 2000 to the Gulf South Conference and then moving to the newly formed Great American Conference (GAC) in 2011. Men's sports include Soccer, Baseball, Basketball, Cross Country, Football, Golf, Tennis, and Track and Field. Women's sports include Basketball, Cheerleading, Cross Country, Golf, Soccer, Softball, Tennis, Track and Field, and Volleyball.

The facilities for the sporting events are: First Security Stadium, Ganus Activities Complex, Stevens Soccer Complex, Jerry Moore Field (baseball), Berry Family Grandstand (softball), Harding Tennis Complex, and the Rhodes-Reaves Field House. On October 19, 2019, the new indoor football facility was dedicated in honor of longtime football head coach Ronnie Huckeba. The Huckeba Field House is the largest indoor practice facility in NCAA Division II and one of the largest in the country for any level.

Music 
Harding has long cultivated a strong tradition of vocal performance. One student group featured as the spokespeople of Pepsi. Another provided vocals for Dolly Parton's album For God and Country.

Spring Sing
Spring Sing is an annual musical production held during Easter Weekend, featuring performances by the social clubs. It is widely attended by current and prospective students, alumni, and Searcy residents. An estimated 12,000 people attended the show each year. Each year, an overall theme is selected, and each club develops music and choreographed routines for the show. Rehearsals begin as early as January. Spring Sing also typically features two hosts, two hostesses, and a general song and choreography ensemble, with these roles chosen by audition. The ensemble performs to music played by the University Jazz Band. Each club act is judged and, according to their performance, awarded a certain sum of money. The clubs then donate this money to charities of their choice.

Student-run media 
The Department of Communications runs the state radio station KVHU.

Alongside publications of the university itself, such as the alumni newsletter Harding Magazine and the yearbook The Petit Jean, students produce their own periodical during the academic year called The Bison. This student-run publication is printed in nine issues per semester and made available through its multimedia website The Link.

In 2011 a group of LGBTQ students at Harding, known as "HU Queer Press" produced a Zine called "State of the Gay," whose website was blocked by the university. A statement from university officials at the time said that “university administrators felt that having this website available on campus goes against [our] mission and policies.” President David Burks called the publication "“offensive and degrading.”  As a result of this decision by the administration, the controversy received attention from national newspapers like The New York Times, The New Yorker, and online platforms like Jezebel (website), and The Huffington Post.

In 2018, HU Queer Press 2.0 was launched, with members producing a zine titled "Hear Queer Voices" aiming to "foster a relationship between Harding University and the queer community."  In April 2022, HU Queer Press 3.0 was announced, with members releasing a zine titled "Look Around," requesting "that Harding University fully acknowledge, affirm, and protect its LGBT students."

Social Clubs 
The university sponsors student-led "social clubs" that serve a similar social networking function to the Greek system, as Harding prohibits formation of local chapters of national social fraternities and sororities. (One exception is Delta Phi, a chapter of Pi Sigma Epsilon). Currently there are 14 women's social clubs and 15 men's social clubs at Harding.

Most of these organizations have adopted Greek letter names that are similar to national fraternity and sorority names. Social clubs are open to all academically eligible students and serve as some of the university's most visible student-led organizations. The clubs are a prominent part of student life with slightly more than half of all undergraduate students participating as social club members.

The social club induction process begins when clubs host "receptions" in the fall to recruit new members. The membership process culminates in Club Week, when each prospective member bonds with the other members of the club through a series of scheduled activities throughout the week. Once a student is accepted into the club, they attend biweekly meetings and can participate in club-sponsored sports, service projects, and Spring Sing.

Hazing controversy 
Harding's social clubs have been involved in hazing controversies over the years. As a result, some have been forced to disband, including the Seminoles (2010), Kappa Sigma Kappa (2005), Mohicans (1981), and most recently Pi Kappa Epsilon (2015).

Religious Conduct and Policies 
Students at Harding University are expected to maintain the highest standards of Christian morality, integrity, orderliness and personal honor. Harding reserves the right to refuse admittance or dismiss any student whose lifestyle is not consistent with the Christian principles that Harding represents.

Employment 
The Faculty Handbook, with narrow exceptions, requires Churches of Christ membership of all faculty members. All faculty members must affirm as part of an annual evaluation that he or she is a member in good standing of a Church of Christ and attends services weekly.

Chapel and Bible Classes 
The university specifies that daily chapel service be held with attendance mandatory for undergraduate students. Chapel programs are "designed to stimulate intellectual, religious, social or aesthetic development," in accordance with the university's mission of combining " faith, learning and living." Excessive absences from daily chapel service may result in disciplinary action.

Harding requires each student enrolled in nine or more hours to regularly attend one Bible class that meets at least three hours a week each semester. Attendance is mandatory, and nonattendance may result in suspension from the university. The university requires students and faculty to dress professionally when attending class, chapel, lyceum, and American Studies programs.

Alcohol and Substance Use 
The consumption, possession or storage of alcoholic beverages of any kind is prohibited at Harding University. This prohibition includes on-campus or off-campus locations. Violation of this policy will result in suspension from the university. White County, Arkansas, where Harding is located, is a Dry county. The use of nicotine in any form is not permitted at any time, including use of electronic cigarettes or vaporizers. Harding also forbids the use, possession, distribution, or sale of drugs or drug-related paraphernalia.

Student Living 
Single undergraduate students, under the age of 22, are required to live on campus, with limited exceptions. Visiting in the residence of a single member of the opposite sex, even though others are present, without permission from a student life dean, is prohibited. Staying overnight in a residence, motel, hotel, or any such arrangement with a member of the opposite sex, without permission from a student life dean, will result in suspension, although explicit sexual immorality may not have been observed.

Students are not to visit inappropriate places of entertainment such as dance clubs or bars. Students are not allowed to participate in suggestive or social dancing.

All-campus Curfew is from 12:15 a.m. until 5 a.m. Sunday through Thursday and 1:15 a.m. until 5 a.m. Friday and Saturday. No activity may take place on campus during all-campus curfew.

Sex and Gender 
Harding explicitly regulates sexual relationships among students and staff. The university explicitly prohibits premarital, extramarital, and homosexual sex.

According to the university's student handbook: "Harding University holds to the biblical principle that God instituted marriage as a relationship between one man and one woman and that gender identity is given by God and revealed in one’s birth sex. Students are prohibited from being married to or dating a person of the same sex. Neither may students engage in behavior suggesting a romantic relationship with a person of the same sex. The University further holds to the biblical principle that sexual relationships outside the context of marriage are unacceptable to God and immoral. Sexual immorality in any form will result in suspension from the University." Harding also forbids the “unwelcome or inappropriate emphasizing of sexual identity.”

In 2017, it was then granted an exception to Title IX, which allows for legal discrimination against LGBTQ+ students on religious grounds. Harding has been listed among the "Absolute Worst Campuses for LGBTQ Youth" in the US by Campus Pride.

People

Notable alumni

Academia 
 Leonard Allen, historian and college administrator
James Bales, professor and administrator
Martin Doyle, ecologist at the Nicholas Institute for Environmental Policy Solutions of Duke University
E. H. Ijams, president of Lipscomb University
Ed Madden, poet, gay rights activist, professor of English, and Director of Women's and Gender Studies at the University of South Carolina
Annie May Alston Lewis, theological librarian
J. Stanley Marshall, college administrator, was president Florida State University
Edward Granville Sewell, American mathematician and professor at University of Texas, El Paso
Rubel Shelly, writer, minister, professor, and former president of Rochester College
Richard Felix Staar, political scientist, historian, and fellow at Stanford

Athletics 
 Janet Cherobon-Bawcom, Olympian distance runner
 Tank Daniels, former NFL American football linebacker
 Scarborough Green, MLB outfielder
 Chad Marshall, an American Major League soccer player
 Bryce Mitchell, mixed martial arts fighter
Jon Murray, university cross country coach
 Jim Nichols, football coach
 Ty Powell, professional football player
Matt Riviera, professional wrestler
 Preacher Roe, Major League Baseball pitcher
 Arthur Hubert "Hubie" Smith, basketball coach
 Stephany Smith, women's basketball coach

Business 
LaMar Baker, businessman and politician
Michael Blue, billionaire entrepreneur and co-founder of Privateer Holdings
 Kathy Flynn, businesswoman

Music, art, and entertainment 
 Tamera Alexander, author
 Roxanne Beck, actress and screenwriter
 Stephen Mark Brown, American opera tenor
 David Ray Campbell, writer and producer
 Verna Howard, founder of the radio International Gospel Hour, originally based in Texarkana, Texas
 Jerry W. Mitchell, investigative reporter and recipient of a "genius grant" from the MacArthur Foundation
 Willie Robertson, star of A&E's Duck Dynasty as well as CEO of Duck Commander
 Korie Robertson, star of A&E's Duck Dynasty and wife of Willie Robertson
 W. Stephen Smith, voice teacher and author, Northwestern University Professor of Voice and Opera
 Ray Walker, singer with The Jordanaires

Politics 
 Tim Barnes, Democratic politician from Tennessee
 Mary Elizabeth Bentley, Republican member of the Arkansas House of Representatives
 Jim R. Caldwell, first Republican member of the Arkansas State Senate in the 20th century
 Jonathan Dismang, politician
 Timothy Chad Hutchinson, attorney and former member of the Arkansas House of Representatives
 Jeremy Kernodle, United States District Judge
 David Porter, Texas Railroad Commissioner
 Kenneth Starr, attorney, judge, U.S. Solicitor General, Special Prosecutor for the Impeachment of Bill Clinton
 Thomas Philip Watson, politician
 Ryan Walters (Oklahoma politician), Oklahoma state secretary of education

Religion 
 Charles Coil, evangelist
 Roger Duke, theologian
Gary Holloway, executive director of the World Convention of Churches of Christ
 Larry M. James, theologian

Other 
George Andrew Davis, Jr., fighter pilot and flying ace of the United States Army Air Forces in World War II and the Korean War
Khalil Jahshan, Palestinian-American activist, media commentator, and executive director of the Arab Center Washington DC
Larry M. James, social worker and CEO of the Dallas housing enterprise CitySquare
Botham Jean, murder victim
Farrell Till, activist and editor of The Skeptical Review

Notable faculty, current and former
Carl Allison, football and baseball coach
Stanley Jennings Carpenter, Medical Entomologist, U.S. Army Colonel
James W. Carr, professor of business and member of the National Security Education Board
James Burton Coffman, preacher, author
James Dickey, basketball coach. Played and coached at Harding.
Ronnie Huckeba, football coach
Paul Fiser, football coach
Jack P. Lewis, theologian
John Robert McRay, biblical scholar
Michael A. O'Donnell, psychologist
Thomas H. Olbricht, biblical scholar
Carroll D. Osburn, theologian and noted biblical scholar
John Prock, football coach
Cheri Yecke, educator and civil servant in the Bush administration

Recipients of honorary degrees 
 Marshall Keeble, African-American minister
 Levy Mwanawasa, president of Zambia
 Cline Paden, missionary
 Jerry Mitchell, journalist, author

Presidents 

J.N. Armstrong (1924–1936)
 George S. Benson (1936–1965)
 Clifton L. Ganus Jr. (1965–1987)
 David Burks (1987–2013)
 Bruce McLarty (2013–2020)
 David Burks (2020-2022)
 Mike Williams (2022–present)

References

External links
 
 Harding Athletics website

 
Educational institutions established in 1924
Universities and colleges affiliated with the Christian churches and churches of Christ
Buildings and structures in Searcy, Arkansas
Private universities and colleges in Arkansas
Restoration Movement
Council for Christian Colleges and Universities
1924 establishments in Arkansas
Education in White County, Arkansas